Ihtiman Airport  is a public use airport located 2 nm west-southwest of Ihtiman, Sofiya, Bulgaria.

See also
List of airports in Bulgaria

References

External links 
 Airport record for Ihtiman Airport at Landings.com

Airports in Bulgaria
Airfield